Acinetobacter gyllenbergii is a gram-negative, oxidase-negative, catalase-positive, strictly aerobic nonmotile bacterium from the genus Acinetobacter isolated from human clinical specimens. It is named in honour of Finnish bacteriologist and taxonomist Helge G. Gyllenberg.

References

Further reading

External links
Type strain of Acinetobacter gyllenbergii at BacDive - the Bacterial Diversity Metadatabase
 	

Moraxellaceae
Bacteria described in 2009